Corealithus is a genus of Phrurolithidae spiders, first described by Takahide Kamura in 2021. It contains two species; C. coreanus and C. subnigerus, distributed in east Asia.

References 

Phrurolithidae genera
Spiders of Asia
Phrurolithidae